Square One Organic Vodka is a spirit distilled from organically grown rye.

Production
Square One Organic Vodka is made from organic American-grown rye, and with water drawn from the Snake River which runs underneath the distillery. The facility gets 25% of its electricity from a local wind farm through renewable energy credits.

History
Allison Evanow formed Square One Organic Spirits, LLC, in Novato, California to launch Square One Organic Vodka in April, 2006.

Reviews
Remarking on the nature of organic and environmentally conscious alcohol brands, including Square One, one reviewer/bar owner wrote "Alcohol is still alcohol, you’re not getting a better buzz or less of a hangover. The point is [...] doing things differently."

See also
List of vodkas

References

External links

American vodkas
Distilleries in California
Organic food
Rye-based drinks
Food and drink companies based in California
Companies based in Marin County, California
Novato, California
American companies established in 2006
Food and drink companies established in 2006
2006 establishments in California
2006 establishments in Idaho
Cuisine of the Western United States
Food and drink in the San Francisco Bay Area
Food and drink companies based in Idaho
Food and drink in Idaho